Volodymyr Stanislavovych Ohryzko (born April 1, 1956) is a Ukrainian diplomat. He served as the Minister of Foreign Affairs of Ukraine from December 18, 2007 to March 3, 2009, when he was fired by the Ukrainian Parliament. On March 17, 2009 Ohryzko was appointed First Deputy Secretary of the National Security and Defense Council by President Viktor Yushchenko.

Resignation
Prime Minister Yulia Tymoshenko commented on the resignation: "If there were no crisis, he should have been dismissed long ago. I think all questions have been failed. The systematic work on discrediting the government was performed by Mr. Ohryzko". Tymoshenko said she had applied to the faction of the Bloc of Yulia Tymoshenko (BYuT) at Parliament with a request not to vote for the dismissal of Ohryzko cause that would stir up the political situation in the country. President Viktor Yushchenko called the dismissal of Ohryzko an "untimely and unfounded move from the Verkhovna Rada".

On March 4, 2009 the faction of BYuT at the Verkhovna Rada pledged its preparedness to support reinstatement of Volodymyr Ohryzko as Foreign Minister ("For the sake of preservation of the majority coalition and further effective work of the parliament of Ukraine") if he would apologies to Prime Minister Yulia Tymoshenko and the Cabinet of Ministers for his actions that, in the opinion of the BYuT caused damage to the reputation of Ukraine. 49 MPs out of 156 from the faction of BYuT voted in favour of the dismissal of Ohryzko a day earlier. Despite this, Ohryzko asked President Viktor Yushchenko not to nominate him for the post of Foreign Affairs Minister in the Cabinet of Ministers on March 5, 2009 and accused BYuT of developing its own foreign policy in parallel to the government's foreign policy.

Ohryzko was placed at number 3 on the electoral list of Ukrainian Platform "Sobor" during the 2012 Ukrainian parliamentary election. But on 15 October 2012 the party withdrew itself from the national list of this election.

After the resignation, in 2013, Ohryzko have said that it was a big mistake for Ukraine to pause the association agreement with the European Union.

Education
In 1978, Ohryzko graduated from Taras Shevchenko Kyiv University.

Awards
The 3rd Class of the Order of Merit (2006)
The Cross of Ivan Mazepa (2010)

References

 	 
 	 

Foreign ministers of Ukraine
Recipients of the Order of Merit (Ukraine), 3rd class
Recipients of the Cross of Ivan Mazepa
Diplomats from Kyiv
Ambassadors of Ukraine to Austria
Taras Shevchenko National University of Kyiv alumni
1956 births
Living people
Republican Platform politicians
Recipients of the Honorary Diploma of the Cabinet of Ministers of Ukraine